Aphian (Apphian, Apian, Appian, Amphianus, Amphian; Amfiano in Spanish and Italian) is venerated as a martyr by the Catholic Church and by the Eastern Orthodox Church.  He is said to have died during the persecutions of the Emperor Galerius on April 2 in or around the year 305.
In the Eastern Orthodox calendar, his feast thus falls on April 2, along with Edesius (Aedisius), who is sometimes called his brother.

Origins
He was from Lycia, and his wealthy and distinguished parents gave him the best education possible in rhetoric, law, and philosophy in the famous school of Berytus in Phoenicia. While he was away at school, he became a Christian.  Aphian withdrew to Cappadocia because his parents resisted his efforts to convert them to Christianity.

Martyrdom
Pamphilus was at Caesarea Maritima at the time of Aphian's martyrdom, expounding Holy Scripture, and the young Aphian was one of his disciples. He lived at the house of Eusebius, but gave no intimation of his purpose to make the public protest which ended in his martyrdom. 

According to his legend, he was only eighteen when he entered the temple at Caesarea Maritima, where the prefect Urbanus was offering sacrifice. Seizing the outstretched hand that was presenting the incense, he reproached the magistrate for his idolatrous act. The guards fell upon him furiously and, after cruelly torturing him, flung him into a dungeon. The next day he was brought before the prefect, torn with iron claws, beaten with clubs, and burned over a slow fire, and then sent back to confinement. After three days he was again taken from prison and thrown into the sea with stones tied to his feet. Eusebius, an eyewitness, declares that an earthquake simultaneously shook the city, and that the sea flung up his corpse on the shore.

Feast
In the old martyrologies his feast was on April 5, but the Bollandists give April 2 as the correct date.

See also
4th century in Lebanon

References

External links
Saints of April 2: Amphianus
 San Amfiano

287 births
305 deaths
4th-century Christian martyrs
4th-century Romans
People executed by drowning
Lycians
Christians martyred during the reign of Diocletian
People of Caesarea Maritima